Yevpraksino is a rural locality (a selo) and the administrative center of Yevpraksinsky Selsoviet, Privolzhsky District, Astrakhan Oblast, Russia. The population was 1,379 as of 2010. There are 20 streets.

Geography 
Yevpraksino is located 29 km south of Nachalovo (the district's administrative centre) by road. Vodyanovka is the nearest rural locality.

References 

Rural localities in Privolzhsky District, Astrakhan Oblast